Sixten Sundström (24 October 1897 – 23 May 1960) was a Swedish athlete. He competed in the men's shot put at the 1924 Summer Olympics.

References

External links
 

1897 births
1960 deaths
Athletes (track and field) at the 1924 Summer Olympics
Swedish male shot putters
Olympic athletes of Sweden